Enrichetta Chiaraviglio-Giolitti (1871 –17 April 1959) was an Italian philanthropist, educational patron and activist. Born in Florence, she was the oldest daughter of five-time Prime Minister of Italy, Giovanni Giolitti. An astute and intellectual woman, she was his confidant and correspondent although they did not always agree on policy. Interested in improving children's education in Italy, she worked with several associations and on commissions to study and create curricula. She was a supporter of Maria Montessori and persuaded Margherita of Savoy to become a patron of her schools.

The institute taught childcare to mothers and trained schoolteachers as in-home health visitors and inspectors. The floating school Caracciolo was launched in 1913 under the direction of Giulia Civita, who had been proposed by Chiaraviglio-Giolitti. The floating kindergarten operated until 1928 when it was closed by the fascist regime. She also worked on reforms of teacher training, attempted to establish secondary schools for girls, and pressed the government to offer agricultural education. Other initiatives included work with malarial children and on child protection laws.

As a women's rights activist, Chiaraviglio-Giolitti joined the Consiglio Nazionale delle Donne Italiane (CNDI, National Council of Italian Women) and fought for women’s suffrage. In 1919, she was appointed to the national executive committee of the Women's International League for Peace and Freedom (WILPF). In 1927, she and her family fled to Argentina to escape Benito Mussolini's regime. They established a metal-working business and participated in anti-fascist organizations. She continued her activism for women, children, and education in Buenos Aires, where she died in 1959. Throughout her life Chiaraviglio-Giolitti maintained a diary and was a prolific letter writer. Her letters are valuable in understanding the political currents of Italy during her lifetime.

Early life

Enrichetta Giolitti was born in 1871 in Florence, Italy, to Rosa (née Sobrero) and Giovanni Giolitti. Her mother was the daughter of Lorenzo Sobrero, the procurator general of the Court of Cassation in Turin and niece of the chemist Ascanio Sobrero. At the time of her birth, Giolitti's father was working as secretary to the Minister of Finance, Quintino Sella. He continued to advance in his political career, serving five times as Prime Minister of Italy. Giolitti was the second child born to the couple but her older brother Giovenale died at birth. Her younger siblings were Lorenzo, Luisa, Federico, Maria and Giuseppe. The children were raised in a liberal environment and were encouraged to discuss personal and public affairs. Thanks to her acute understanding of politics and human nature, she was her father's favorite child and his confident. The two often exchanged letters presenting their views on the political situation in Italy. Giovanni described her philosophy, explaining that she started "for the most part from the concept of what men should be, then from what a government should be, and when you see a government that does not respond to this ideal, you would like to bring it down". He was more pragmatic, recognizing that neither governments nor men could be perfect but should strive to be better.

On 14 August 1894, in Cavour, Giolitti married . Mario was an engineer, who had graduated the previous year from the University of Rome. After their marriage, the couple moved to Berlin, where Mario was employed with Siemens. Giovanni joined them for some months in 1895, during a period when he was facing arrest and his government had collapsed. They then moved to Leipzig, where their eldest son Curio was born on 25 June 1897. Three children followed, Tito (born 1902), Sergio, and Marcella. By 1906, the family had returned to Rome, where Mario was a railway engineer. He worked for the national railway department on the construction of the Genoa and Riviera tramways and was elected as a radical politician in 1909, serving through 1919.

Activism (1909–1929)

Educational reform
Chiaraviglio-Giolitti was particularly keen on education for disadvantaged children and an ardent supporter of Maria Montessori. A wave of anti-Montessori critics emerged after the 1911 conference held to discuss which method of instruction should apply to kindergartens in Italy. Both the Agazzi sisters and Froebel advocated learning through guided play. Montessori argued that children should be allowed to learn through their normal daily activities, which would lead them to learn reading and writing out of curiosity. At issue was whether or not the nation should endorse early education that introduced reading and writing. Ultimately, the Minister of Education, announced that spring that Italian kindergartens would follow Froebelian methods.

As women at the time were usually not educated beyond secondary school, the curricula was designed to teach mothers how to care for their children and train school teachers to become in-home health visitors and assist school doctors as health inspectors. The association was involved in national studies to improve the health of children through laboratory research, upgrading of facilities, and training for caregivers in the drive to limit infections of malaria and provide treatment.

Chiaraviglio-Giolitti worked on creating an asylum for orphans, and assisted in the creation of the floating school Caracciolo in Naples, replicating projects on the ships Garaventa in Genoa and Scilla in Venice. The idea of the floating kindergarten was to take in homeless street urchins and provide them with the education and training they needed to become productive citizens. She also recommended that the school should be under the direction of Giulia Civita. The pyrocorvet Caracciolo was commissioned by the minister in 1912 and the school was inaugurated in April 1913. Board members Chiaraviglio-Giolitti, Paolo Boselli, and Luigi Luzzatti met regularly with the Ministry of the Navy and the Ministry of Education to coordinate the programs. The Caracciolo school operated under Civita's direction until it was terminated by the fascist regime in 1928.

Among other projects, in 1913, Chiaraviglio-Giolitti served on the national commission to reform secondary and normal schools. The Daneo-Credaro Law of 1911 had set forth the need to study and reform teacher training, as there were insufficient and inadequately trained personnel to teach at elementary schools. On the commission chaired by Guido Fusinato were politicians, social activists, teachers, school inspectors, and representatives from the Ministry of Agriculture, Industry and Commerce. Although it was proposed that a women's secondary school be established for girls who did not want to pursue teaching, the commission could not agree on its need. They proposed co-educational normal courses which trained students both in the practical skills for teaching and in pedagogical theory. Chiaraviglio-Giolitti presented a separate report, which although it supported the teaching program in general, recommended making it less didactic and more oriented towards a broader group of students including women, as well as middle- and working-class pupils. Ultimately none of the suggestions were implemented because of a change in the political regime and the onset of World War I.

They pointed out that the approved curricula at that time barred agricultural training and argued that both normal and rural schools should provide such sources to prepare for meeting food requirements. The organization was designed to act as a network to provide assistance to mothers and children, giving them referrals to available aid from agencies, assisting them with basic child care supplies, providing education on child welfare through visiting nurses or health workers, and establishing connections to government to enact child protection laws and integrate those policies in hospitals, schools, and child care facilities.

Women's rights
Chiaraviglio-Giolitti was a committed women's rights activist, and a member of the Consiglio Nazionale delle Donne Italiane (CNDI, National Council of Italian Women). In 1907, she began working on an initiative to assist women and children who emigrated. She was elected as a vice president of the CNDI's  (Women's Secretariat for Women and Children Emigrants), along with Maria Lisa Danieli-Camozzi (president),  (vice president), and Beatrice Berio (secretary). She participated in the 1908 first suffrage congress held in Rome, presenting a paper on emigration to Brazil. The following year, Italian women formed two branches (Milan and Rome) of the International Committee of Women for Permanent Peace, which would become the Women's International League for Peace and Freedom (WILPF) in 1919. The national executive committee was made up of Chiaraviglio-Giolitti, Anita Dobelli-Zampetti, Rosa Genoni, and Elisa Lollini-Agnini, each of whom immediately came under suspicion by authorities for subversive activities. From 1919, Chiaraviglio-Giolitti and Dobelli-Zampetti edited the WILPF column which appeared in the suffragist publication  (The Trial). Women's suffrage had been granted to European women, except in France and Italy by the end of World War I and WILPF in Italy became one of the main organizations pressing for the vote. The rise of fascism in 1922 made Italian WILPF members and other anti-fascists targets of the regime. Their meetings and events had to be moved to various venues to avoid attacks from fascist gangs, making it difficult to keep the organization functional.

Argentina (1929–1959)
After the murder of Giacomo Matteotti and with the declining health of her father, whose power had protected the family from the political upheaval, Chiaraviglio-Giolitti fled with twenty family members to Buenos Aires in 1927. In 1929, her husband and sons formed  (Chiaraviglio Brothers), a company which initially imported Italian metal curtains and then began manufacturing them. In the 1930s, they transitioned to manufacturing valves for the sanitary infrastructure of Argentina and in the 1950s, changed the firm again, renaming it  (Argentine Motorcycle Mechanics). Chiaraviglio-Giolitti continued her work in social and educational activism in Argentina. The entire family, including Marcella, who had married , were involved in the organization  (Free Italy Association of the Argentine Republic) and opposed Benito Mussolini and his regime.

Death and legacy
Chiaraviglio-Giolitti died on 17 April 1959, in Martínez, Buenos Aires. During her lifetime, Chiaraviglio-Giolitti was a prolific letter writer and diarist. Going back to at least 1893, her archive offers insight into her father's thinking and into some of the political events during his tenure as Prime Minister of Italy. Many topics were covered, including the Banca Romana scandal (1893), the issues which erupted during the Rudinì Ministry over the unauthorized release of treaty negotiations between Great Britain and Italy (1896), the planned assassination attempted on Giolitti by the Salandra regime (1915), and the military crisis resulting from the Battle of Caporetto (1917). Her correspondence was also used extensively by Luciana Frassati in creating the three-volume biography, Alfredo Frassati in the History and Historiography of Modern Italy of her father, who was a friend of Giliotti and correspondent with Chiaraviglio-Giolitti.

Notes

References

Citations

Bibliography

 

 

1871 births
1959 deaths
People from Florence
Italian pacifists
Italian suffragists
Italian women's rights activists
Italian philanthropists
Women's International League for Peace and Freedom people
Pacifist feminists
Children of national leaders
20th-century women philanthropists
Italian emigrants to Argentina
Italian diarists
Women diarists